Patnam Rajender Reddy Memorial Engineering College (PRRM) is an private engineering college in the Shabad village, Rangareddy district, Telangana, India.

The institute integrates classroom learning with work experience in the industry or in the concerned professional field.  During the first year, stress is laid on development of manual skills, communication skills, courses on general education and an introduction to engineering. The institute also encourages students to undergo practical training during the summer vacations.

Patnam Rajender Reddy Memorial Engineering College was founded in November 1998. The first graduates, in 2002, had a pass percentage of 98.6%. The college is affiliated with Jawaharlal Nehru Technological University, Hyderabad. PRRM Engineering College is sponsored by the Patnam Rajender Reddy Memorial Engineering College  Educational Society, registered under the societies act. The chairman is Dr. Mahender Reddy, an MLA from Tandur.

The college has been approved by the All India Council for Technical Education, New Delhi (vide Lr no: 730-5-276/E/ET/98, dated 9 June 1998) and approved by the government of Andhra Pradesh (vide G.O. Ms no:286, dated 26 August 1998).

References

External links
PRRM Engineering College

Engineering colleges in Telangana
1998 establishments in Andhra Pradesh
Educational institutions established in 1998